Sutterville (also, Sutter, Sutter City, and Suttersville) is a former settlement in Sacramento County, California.

John A. Sutter had Lansford W. Hastings and John Bidwell lay out the town in 1844, south of his embarcadero on a low bluff overlooking the Sacramento River. In exchange, Hastings and Bidwell both received a share of the lots. It was in this settlement that George Zins built one of the first brick structures in California in 1847. When the town of Sacramento developed at his embarcadero, Sutterville fell into decline. The Sutterville post office operated from 1855 to 1860. Sutterville was the site of Camp Union, a major California Volunteer training camp during the American Civil War.

Sutterville is also California Historical Landmark #593.

References

Former settlements in Sacramento County, California
Former populated places in California
Populated places established in 1844
California Historical Landmarks